SS Hsin Yu was a Chinese Army transport ship that served during the Warlord Era.  The 1,629-ton ship had been built in 1889. On 22 April 1916, the transport, with over a thousand enlisted men and officers on board, was in a thick fog while on its way to Foo Chow.  South of the Chusan Islands, the cruiser  accidentally collided with Hsin Yu.  A foreign engineer, nine sailors, and 20 soldiers were the only survivors.  The ship sank with the loss of more than 1,000 lives.  The date of the disaster has frequently (and mistakenly) been listed as 29 August 1916 although it occurred four months earlier.

References

World War I naval ships of China
Maritime incidents in 1916
1889 ships
Ships sunk in collisions
Shipwrecks in the East China Sea
Shipwrecks of China